Mevik is a village in the municipality of Gildeskål in Nordland county, Norway. The village is located along Norwegian County Road 17. Mevik Chapel is located in the village.

References

Gildeskål
Villages in Nordland